Rochester Institute of Technology has had 10 presidents since it was founded in 1829.

List of presidents
 Carleton B. Gibson (1910–1916)
 James F. Barker (1916–1919)
 Royal B. Farnum (1919–1921)
 John A. Randall (1922–1936)
 Mark W. Ellingson (1936–1969)
 Paul A. Miller (1969–1979)
 M. Richard Rose (1979–1992)
 Albert J. Simone (1992–2007)
 William W. Destler  (2007–2017) 
 David C. Munson (2017 – Present)

References

Rochester Institute of Technology
Presidents of Rochester Institute of Technology
Rochester Institute of Technology people